Black Ink Crew: Chicago is an American reality television series that airs on VH1 and premiered on October 26, 2015. It is the Chicago-based spin-off of Black Ink Crew. It chronicles the daily operations and staff drama at an African American owned and operated tattoo shop, 9MAG, located in Chicago, Illinois.

Cast

Cast timeline

Main cast members
 Ryan Henry, owner of 9MAG and tattoo artist. Ex-boyfriend of Rachel. Ex-lover of Katrina. 
 Van Johnson (seasons 1–5; recurring seasons 6–7B), tattoo artist
 Corey "Phor Brumfield" Robinson, tattoo artist. Ex-boyfriend of Nikki and Kat.
 Don Brumfield, piercer, manager, younger brother of Phor, and Ashley's husband
 Charmaine Walker (seasons 1–7A), owner of 2nd City Ink, wife of Neek Bey, ex-fling of Don Brumfield
 Liliana "Lily" Barrios (seasons 4–5; recurring season 3; guest season 6), tattoo artist and Junior's ex-girlfriend
 Katrina "Kat" Jackson (seasons 1–3; guest season 6), tattoo artist and Phor Brumfield's ex-girlfriend
 Danielle Jamison (seasons 1–4; recurring seasons 5–7A), ex-receptionist and Charmaine's cousin
 Jessica "Jess" Simpson (season 6), co-owner of 2nd City Ink and tattoo artist
 Karis "Miss Kitty" Phillips (season 7; recurring season 6; guest season 5), brand ambassador and brand manager for Black Ink, 2nd City Ink
 Andrea "Draya" Penso (season 7B; recurring seasons 6–7A), tattoo artist at 2nd City Ink & 9MAG 
 Prince Spencer (season 7B; recurring seasons 6–7A), tattoo artist at 2nd City Ink & 9MAG

Supporting cast members
 Ashley Brumfield (seasons 1–7), Don's wife
 Rachel Leigh (seasons 1, 3–4, 6; guest seasons 2, 5), Ryan's ex-girlfriend
 Cobra Kat (seasons 2–5), tattoo artist
 Junior Diaz (seasons 2–5), tattoo artist and Lily's ex-boyfriend
 Terrence (seasons 1–2, 4; guest season 3), Danielle's husband
 Whitney Womack (season 2), Don's daughter's mother
 Ariel (season 2), Charmaine's friend and Ryan's ex-lover
 NeekBey (seasons 3, 5–7A; guest season 4), Charmaine's husband
 Nikki (seasons 3–4; guest seasons 2, 5–6), Phor's ex-girlfriend and Kat's rival
 Jenn (seasons 3–4; guest seasons 1–2), Van's girlfriend
 Reese (season 4; guest season 5), tattoo artist at Loyal Ink
 Bella (seasons 4–6), former 9Mag assistant
 Brittney Slam (seasons 4–7), 9Mag manager
 Gina (seasons 5–7), Ryan's assistant
 Shine (season 5), tattoo artist
 Evenita (season 5), Van's apprentice
 Adriana (season 5; guest season 4), Junior's girlfriend and Lily's rival
 Fly Tatted (season 6), former tattoo artist at 2nd City Ink
 Plug (season 6–7A), tattoo artist at 2nd City Ink
 Zach (season 6), former tattoo artist at 2nd City Ink and Draya's former love interest
 Steven (seasons 6–7A; guest season 7B), tattoo artist at 2nd Ciity Ink and Jess's best friend from London
 Nina Austin (season 7), Phor's ex-girlfriend and mother of their son
 Miriah (season 7A), Charmaine's friend and Prince's ex-girlfriend
 Hiram Emmanuél "Shogun" (season 7), lead artist at 9MAG
 Ceci (season 7), tattoo artist at 2nd City Ink & 9MAG

Episodes

Season 1 (2015)

Season 2 (2016)

Season 3 (2017)

Season 4 (2018)

Season 5 (2019)

Season 6 (2019–20)

Season 7 (2021–22)

See also
 List of tattoo TV shows

References

External links
 
 

2010s American reality television series
2020s American reality television series
2015 American television series debuts
English-language television shows
VH1 original programming
Black Ink Crew
Television shows set in Chicago
Television series set in tattoo shops
American television spin-offs
Reality television spin-offs